Hal G. Harper (born March 11, 1948) is an American politician in the state of Montana. He served in the Montana House of Representatives from 1972 to 1974 and 1976 to 2000. In 1985 and 1989, he served as majority leader of the House, and in 1991 as Speaker of the House. He later served as an adviser to Montana Governor Brian Schweitzer. Harper is an alumnus of the University of Montana and has worked in construction.

References

1948 births
Living people
Politicians from Nashville, Tennessee
Politicians from Helena, Montana
University of Montana alumni
Montana Democrats
Montana Republicans
Members of the Montana House of Representatives
Speakers of the Montana House of Representatives